Rajokri earlier known as "Harjokri" is a census town in New Delhi District (earlier in South West Delhi district) in the Indian union territory of Delhi. Rajokri village is near Gurgaon border on NH-8.This village is one of the oldest village in Delhi.

Demographics
 India census, Rajokri had a population of 12,758. It is a major Yadav village and is a part of Ahirwal. Rajokri mainly consists of people having the Jhagdoliya gotra of the Yadav caste.  There are many temples, But the most famous temples are Kholi Baba Temple and Lord Shiva Temple/Mahadev Mandir. There are 3 Banks, 13 ATMs, post office (inside AfS)                         warehouses for Nyka, Myntra, Udaan, Naptol,            2 fuel station at outer side of village motel Mapple, RIT(Rajokri Institute of Technology) is just opened in 2019, Air Force Station, Kendriya Vidyalaya, Govt girls and boys schools junior government schools and many Schools are now opened in Rajokri.

It is the first village of New Delhi on NH-8 while coming from Gurgaon to Delhi. Acharya Narendra Dev College of Delhi University was opened in Rajokri, but could not function here due to some issues. Rajokri houses luxurious and the most expensive farm houses in Delhi. The farm house schemes includes 
The Green, Westend Greens, Grand Westend Greens etc.

Negative points - No public transport
No ground, no park, no police post,
by the government.

Unauthorized encroachment/construction is done daily basis in aravali
ruined all the forests.

There are 12 brethren villages (11 of Yadavs and 1 of Jat) of which Rajokri is a part. These are Sarhol (Chief village of the Brethren), Rajokri, Kapashera, Dundahera, Molahera, Sikanderpur, Nathupur, Chakkarpur, Wazirabad, Kanhai, Samalka and Bijwasan.

References

Cities and towns in South Delhi district